Norman Leroy Siebern (July 26, 1933 – October 30, 2015) was an American professional baseball player and scout. He might be most remembered, however, as being one of the players the Yankees traded for Roger Maris on December 11, 1959.

Siebern was born in St. Louis, where he graduated from Wellston High School. He attended Missouri State University (then known as Southwest Missouri State) and Washington University in St. Louis, and was signed by Yankees scout Lou Maguolo in 1951.

Baseball career

New York Yankees
Siebern's minor league career was interrupted by two full years (1954–1955) of military service. His first stint with the Yankees came two months into the  season. Recalled from Triple-A Denver in June, Siebern appeared in 54 games, starting 39 in left field, second-most to Elston Howard's 50, but, hampered by injury, he hit only .204 with four home runs in 162 at bats. He appeared as a pinch hitter in Game 2 of the 1956 World Series, flying out against Don Bessent of the Brooklyn Dodgers in the sixth inning. The Yankees lost that game, 13–8, but went on to capture the Series in seven games, earning Siebern his first world championship ring. He spent all of 1957 in Denver, where he led the American Association in batting (.349), runs scored (124) and hits (191), and was named to the Association's All-Star team.

In , Siebern made the major leagues for good. He became the Yankees' most-used left fielder, starting 118 games. At the plate, Siebern was one of the pennant-winning club's top offensive performers. He batted an even .300 and his 138 hits trailed only Mickey Mantle (158) and Tony Kubek (148) among his teammates. He also won his only career Gold Glove Award for his defensive prowess as an outfielder. However, the 1958 World Series would be a difficult one for Siebern. He started in left field for three of the Series' first four games against the Milwaukee Braves, including Games 3 and 4 at Yankee Stadium. With all World Series games then played in the afternoon, and home plate in autumnal shadows, left field was a notoriously treacherous position at Yankee Stadium: outfielders often were forced to track fly balls while staring into a blinding sun. According to The New York Times, "In Game 4 of the Series, with the Yankees down two games to one, Siebern lost a handful of fly balls in the sun or in the lights, which had been turned on to accommodate television. Although he wasn’t charged with an error, his misplays had a role in all three runs of a 3–0 Braves victory. Manager Casey Stengel benched him for the rest of the Series, which the Yankees came back to win."

The following season, saw the Yankees slump to third place in the American League, winning only 79 games overall. Siebern started only 82 games in left field and recorded 101 fewer plate appearances than he did in 1958. His production declined to a .271 batting mark, with 28 extra base hits, ten fewer than in 1958. On December 11, 1959, he became part of one of the most famous transactions in Yankees' annals. In a seven-player trade, he was dealt to the second-division Kansas City Athletics, along with veteran World Series heroes Don Larsen and Hank Bauer and future New York Mets legend Marv Throneberry, in exchange for 25-year-old outfielder Roger Maris and two others, first baseman Kent Hadley and shortstop Joe DeMaestri.

Kansas City Athletics
Siebern spent four seasons in Kansas City. In 1962, Siebern led the American League in games played (162) and finished second in runs batted in, third in on-base plus slugging percentage (OPS), and seventh in MVP balloting — Siebern averaged 153 games played per season, 162 hits, 54 extra-base hits, 92 runs batted in, and a .289 batting average. He hit 78 home runs in a Kansas City uniform, and was selected to three American League All-Star squads as a first baseman, where he moved permanently in June 1961. His hitting was one of the few bright spots for a Kansas City team that averaged 94 defeats each season from 1960 through 1963. On November 27, 1963, he was swapped to the Baltimore Orioles for their veteran first baseman, Jim Gentile, and cash.

Baltimore Orioles
But his offense suffered; he batted only .245 with only 12 home runs and 56 runs batted in in 596 plate appearances, although he led all American League batters in bases on balls received (106). Still, Baltimore won a team-record 97 games and finished only two games behind the Yankees in the pennant race. In , Siebern began to split first-base duty with 23-year-old former Orioles' left fielder Boog Powell; he started 67 games and batted .256 with eight home runs. 

With Powell becoming entrenched as Baltimore's regular first-sacker, Siebern was earmarked for trade and he became an important footnote to perhaps the most momentous transaction in Oriole history. On December 2, 1965, he was sent to the California Angels for Dick Simpson, a young outfielder. Simpson would never appear in a Baltimore uniform, and his tenure on the Oriole roster would last only one week. On December 9, Baltimore included him in a blockbuster trade in which Simpson, starting pitcher Milt Pappas and relief pitcher Jack Baldschun were dealt to the Cincinnati Reds for future Baseball Hall of Fame outfielder Frank Robinson. After a  season during which he won the Triple Crown, Robinson led the Orioles to the American League pennant and 1966 World Series championship. Then, from 1969 through 1971, Robinson was a central figure in three more pennant-winning Baltimore teams.

Late MLB career
Siebern's final three MLB seasons were spent with three clubs: the Angels, San Francisco Giants and Boston Red Sox. In 1966, Siebern started 94 games for the Angels as their most-used first baseman. But his batting stroke did not return; he hit .247 with five home runs in 336 at bats in his only year in Anaheim. The off-season saw him traded again, to the Giants for journeyman outfielder Len Gabrielson. On July 15, the Giants sent him back to the American League, selling his contract to the Junior Circuit's surprise pennant contender, the "Impossible Dream" Red Sox. 

Siebern was used almost exclusively as a pinch hitter for Boston (he got into only 14 innings in the field, ten at first base). But he provided a clutch, three-run triple on August 19 to help the Red Sox defeat the Angels, 12–11. After the Red Sox prevailed in the pennant race by one game, Siebern participated in his third and last World Series, the 1967 Fall Classic against the St. Louis Cardinals. In the seventh inning of Game 1, he pinch hit for Red Sox catcher Russ Gibson, but was left at home plate when Reggie Smith was caught stealing to end the frame. Staying in the game in right field, Siebern handled no fielding chances while stationed in Fenway Park's most notoriously hard-to-play outfield position, then came to the plate to lead off the Boston eighth inning against Hall of Famer Bob Gibson. Siebern singled to center field, then was replaced by pinch runner José Tartabull. He appeared in two other World Series games as a pinch hitter, going hitless to finish one for three (.333).  The Cardinals defeated the Red Sox in seven games.  Siebern remained with the Red Sox as a pinch hitter into the  regular season, but he collected only two hits in 30 at bats and was released on August 7, 1968.

During his regular-season MLB career, Siebern hit .272 with 1,217 hits (including 206 doubles, 38 triples and 132 home runs). He knocked in 636 runs. Defensively, his career fielding percentage was .991. At first base his fielding percentage was .992 and as an outfielder was .984. He batted .167 (two for 12) in his three World Series. In All-Star play, he was hitless in two at bats as a pinch hitter. He scouted for the Atlanta Braves and Kansas City Royals after his playing career.

Siebern played basketball at Southwest Missouri State alongside his future New York and Kansas City baseball teammate Jerry Lumpe on a team that won two NAIA Championships in 1952 and 1953. Both players had to miss some tournament games to report to baseball spring training camp with the Yankees.

References

External links

1933 births
2015 deaths
American League All-Stars
American men's basketball players
Atlanta Braves scouts
Baltimore Orioles players
Baseball players from St. Louis
Basketball players from St. Louis
Birmingham Barons players
Boston Red Sox players
California Angels players
Denver Bears players
Gold Glove Award winners
Joplin Miners players
Kansas City Athletics players
Kansas City Royals scouts
Major League Baseball first basemen
Major League Baseball outfielders
McAlester Rockets players
Missouri State Bears basketball players
New York Yankees players
San Francisco Giants players
Washington University in St. Louis alumni